The Karnataka State Film Awards 2012, presented by Government of Karnataka, to felicitate the best of Kannada Cinema released in the year 2012.

Lifetime achievement award

Jury 

A committee headed by film producer K. C. N. Chandrashekar was appointed to evaluate the feature films awards.

Film Awards

Other Awards

References

Karnataka State Film Awards